Willis F. La Du was a member of the Wisconsin State Assembly.

Biography
La Du was born on July 2, 1856 in Richmond Township, Tioga County, Pennsylvania. He moved with his parents to Mosinee, Wisconsin in 1866. He was in the lumber business. La Du died on August 30, 1929.

Career
La Du was elected to the Assembly in 1902. Additionally, he served as President of the Board of Supervisors of Bergen, Marathon County, Wisconsin from 1888 to 1890, President of Mosinee in 1890 and Postmaster of Mosinee from 1904 to 1908. He was a Democrat.

References

External links
The Political Graveyard

People from Tioga County, Pennsylvania
People from Mosinee, Wisconsin
Businesspeople from Wisconsin
Mayors of places in Wisconsin
Democratic Party members of the Wisconsin State Assembly
1856 births
1929 deaths
Wisconsin postmasters